Arizona elegans is a species of medium-sized colubrid snake commonly referred to as the glossy snake or the faded snake, which is endemic to the southwestern United States and Mexico. It has several subspecies. Some have recommended that A. elegans occidentalis be granted full species status.

Subspecies 
Subspecies of Arizona elegans include:

 Arizona elegans arenicola Dixon, 1960 – Texas glossy snake
 Arizona elegans candida Klauber, 1946 – Western Mojave glossy snake
 Arizona elegans eburnata Klauber, 1946 – Desert glossy snake
 Arizona elegans elegans Kennicott, 1859 – Kansas glossy snake
 Arizona elegans expolita Klauber, 1946 – Chihuahua glossy snake
 Arizona elegans noctivaga Klauber, 1946 – Arizona glossy snake
 Arizona elegans occidentalis Blanchard, 1924 – California glossy snake
 Arizona elegans philipi Klauber, 1946 – Painted Desert glossy snake

Description
The glossy snake and its many subspecies are all similar in appearance to gopher snakes. However, they are smaller than gopher snakes, with narrow, pointed heads, and a variety of skin patterns and colors. They appear "washed-out" or pale, hence the common name, "faded snakes".

Most subspecies are ca. 75–130 cm (ca. 30-50 inches) in total length. The maximum recorded total length for the species is 142 cm (56 in).

They are shades of tan, brown, and gray with spotted patterns on their smooth, glossy skin, and a white or cream-colored unmarked ventral surface. Coloration often varies in relation to the color of the soil in a snake's native habitat.

Habitat

Habitat is normally semi-arid grasslands of the southwestern United States, from California in the west to Kansas in the east and as far south as Texas, and northern Mexico.

Behavior and diet
They are nonvenomous, nocturnal predators of small lizards.

Reproduction
Glossy snakes are oviparous. Adults breed in the late spring and early summer. Clutches average from 10 to 20 eggs.

References

Further reading
Kennicott, R. in Baird, S.F. 1859. United States and Mexican Boundary Survey, under the Order of Lieut. Col. W. H. Emory, Major First Cavalry, and United States Commissioner. Reptiles of the Boundary, with Notes by the Naturalists of the Survey [Volume 2]. United States Government. Washington, District of Columbia. 35 pp. + Plates I.- XLI. (Arizona elegans, pp. 18–19 + Plate XIII.)
Klauber, L.M. 1946. The Glossy Snake, Arizona, with Descriptions of New Subspecies. Transactions of the San Diego Society of Natural History 10 (17):311-398.

External links

Species Arizona elegans at The Reptile Database

Colubrids
Reptiles of Mexico
Reptiles of the United States
Snake, Glossy
Snake, Glossy
Reptiles described in 1859